"Edge of the Earth" is a 2003 song by Thirty Seconds to Mars

Edge of the Earth may also refer to:

 Edge of the Earth (album), a 2011 album by Sylosis
 The Edge of the Earth, an EP by Switchfoot

See also
Edge of the World (disambiguation)